Chah Lak (also Romanized as Chāh Lak; also known as Chāh Lākī, Chāh Log, Chāh Logh, and Cherāghābād-e Chāh Log) is a village in Qaleh Ganj Rural District, in the Central District of Qaleh Ganj County, Kerman Province, Iran. At the 2006 census, its population was 213, in 43 families.

References 

Populated places in Qaleh Ganj County